Meyami (also Romanized as Mayāmī, Maiāmai) is a city in and capital of Meyami County, Semnan Province, Iran. At the 2006 census, its population was 4,057, in 1,116 families.

Landmarks
Meyami Caravanserai is located in the center of Meyami and is one of the beautiful caravanserais of the Safavid era that is almost intact. This building is in the form of a central courtyard, with a base of 5250 square meters and is of the type of four porches made of bricks. The entrance  is in the shape of a porch and has two floors, is located on the north side of the caravanserai. Carved stone inscriptions have been installed in the entrance door, the date of construction and its founder are written on it, and it is unique in this respect. 

Miami Caravanserai is listed as a national monument of Iran in 1986 and is currently the location of the Anthropological Museum of Miami.

References

Populated places in Meyami County

Cities in Semnan Province